Grone, Grône, Gröne may refer to:

 Grone, Lombardy, Italian comune in Bergamo province
 Grone (river), German river
 Gröne, German surname
 Grône, Swiss municipality in Valais canton